Zillah Byng-Thorne (born 1974/1975) is a British businesswoman, and the CEO of Future plc, a FTSE 250 Index British media company, since April 2014. She was described by The Guardian in September 2022 as "one of the UK’s most successful media executives."

Early life
She grew up near Glasgow, and earned a MA in management from University of Glasgow and a MSc in behavioural change from Henley Business School.

Career
Byng-Thorne qualified as an accountant with Nestlé UK. She later had senior finance roles with GE Capital and HMV, before becoming CFO of Threshers, then finance director of Fitness First. 

She was previously CFO of Auto Trader Group.

Byng-Thorne joined Future in November 2013 as a part-time chief financial officer (CFO), and became CEO in April 2014. In 2021, she earned £8.8 million as chief executive, which included a salary of £575,000, a bonus of £1.15 million and £7.03 million through a performance share plan. 

She is a non-executive director of Mecom and Betfair. She was the senior independent non-executive director of online retailer THG until stepping down in September 2022, at the same time as she was appointed as deputy chairman of online reviews site Trustpilot.

Personal life
She is married to Max Thorne. She has three sons and two stepsons.

References

Living people
British women chief executives
1970s births
Alumni of the University of Glasgow
Alumni of the University of Reading
Chief financial officers
British accountants